The following is a list of the lieutenant governors of British Columbia. Though the present day office of the lieutenant governor in British Columbia came into being only upon the province's entry into Canadian Confederation in 1871, the post is a continuation from the first governorship of Vancouver Island in 1849, although without the same executive powers as governors had. There were also colonial lieutenant-governors whose job was that of deputy to the governor.

Lieutenant governors of British Columbia, 1871–present

See also

 Office-holders of Canada
 List of Canadian incumbents by year

References

External links
 

British Columbia
Lieutenant Governors